Archery at the 1988 Summer Paralympics consisted of nine events.

Medal table

Participating nations

Medal summary

References 

 

1988 Summer Paralympics events
1988
Paralympics